Berthold Slupik (31 July 1928 – 5 March 1992) was a German modern pentathlete. He competed at the 1952 Summer Olympics.

References

1928 births
1992 deaths
German male modern pentathletes
Olympic modern pentathletes of Germany
Modern pentathletes at the 1952 Summer Olympics